The 1955 International Cross Country Championships was held in San Sebastián, Spain, at the Lasarte Hippodrome on March 19, 1955.  In addition, an unofficial women's championship was held one week later at Ayr, Scotland on March 26, 1955.   A report on the men's event as well as the women's event was given in the Glasgow Herald.

Complete results for men, and for women (unofficial), medallists, and the results of British athletes were published.

Medallists

Individual Race Results

Men's (9 mi / 14.5 km)

Women's (1.9 mi / 3.0 km, unofficial)

Team Results

Men's

Women's (unofficial)

Participation

Men's
An unofficial count yields the participation of male 70 athletes from 8 countries.

 (9)
 (9)
 (9)
 (9)
 (8)
 (9)
 (9)
 (8)

Women's
An unofficial count yields the participation of 12 female athletes from 2 countries.

 (6)
 (6)

See also
 1955 in athletics (track and field)

References

International Cross Country Championships
International Cross Country Championships
Cross
International Cross Country Championships
Sport in San Sebastián
Cross country running in Spain
Cross country running in the United Kingdom